Stallbohm Barn-Kaske House, also known as Bieker Woods and Heritage Park, is a historic home and English barn located at Munster, Lake County, Indiana. The house was built in 1909, and is a two-story, American Foursquare frame dwelling.  It has a jerkinhead roof and is sheathed in clapboard siding.  The English barn was built about 1890, is a -story wood-frame building with horizontal siding on a brick foundation. The property is now a local public park.

It was listed in the National Register of Historic Places in 1998.

References

Houses on the National Register of Historic Places in Indiana
Barns on the National Register of Historic Places in Indiana
Houses completed in 1909
Buildings and structures in Lake County, Indiana
National Register of Historic Places in Lake County, Indiana